Hot Springs School District may refer to:

Hot Springs School District (Arkansas)
Hot Springs School District (South Dakota)